Wayne Black and Kevin Ullyett were the defending champions but did not compete that year.

Julian Knowle and Michael Kohlmann won in the final against Jiří Novák and Radek Štěpánek.

Seeds

  Joshua Eagle /  Sandon Stolle (quarterfinals)
  Petr Pála /  Pavel Vízner (first round)
  Jiří Novák /  Radek Štěpánek (final)
  Andrew Florent /  David Macpherson (first round)

Draw

External links
 2002 Copenhagen Open Doubles draw

2002 Copenhagen Open – 2
2002 ATP Tour